The 1988 Korean Professional Football League was the sixth season of K League. A total of five teams participated in the league, all of them were professional teams. The season began on 26 March 1988 and ended on 12 November 1988. The season was operated in single stage, and every team played each other six times.

This season caused a controversy over the selection of the Most Valuable Player. The majority opinion of outsiders was that Lee Kee-keun should receive the MVP Award, but the Korean Professional Football Committee chose Park Kyung-hoon, who played only 12 games in the league due to his schedule in the national team. Park also tried to return the award, but the committee rejected his decision.

League table

Top scorers

Awards

Main awards

Source:

Best XI

Source:

References

External links
 RSSSF

K League seasons
1
South Korea
South Korea